Bala Shahr may refer to:
 Bala Shahr, Jahrom